Roberto Sponza (born 20 August 1951 in Trieste, Italy) is an Italian yacht racer who competed in the 1976 Summer Olympics.

References

1951 births
Living people
Italian male sailors (sport)
Olympic sailors of Italy
Sailors at the 1976 Summer Olympics – 470
Sportspeople from Trieste
Mediterranean Games gold medalists for Italy